The men's underwear index (MUI) is an economic index that can supposedly detect the beginnings of a recovery during an economic slump. The premise is that men's underwear are a necessity in normal economic times and sales remain stable.  During a severe downturn, demand for these goods changes as new purchases are deferred.   Hence, men's purchasing habits for underwear (and that of their spouses on their behalf) is thought to be a good indicator of discretionary spending for consumption at large especially during turnaround periods.  

This indicator is noted for being followed by former Federal Reserve Chairman, Alan Greenspan.

See also
Big Mac index
Hemline index
Lipstick index

References

External links
 Alan Greenspan's Underwear Drawer January 1, 2008
 Blue Chip, White Cotton: What Underwear Says About the Economy By Ylan Q. Mui Washington Post Staff Writer Monday, August 31, 2009
 May 25, 2011 Unemployment Rate Hits 9.7 Percent As Economy Sheds 216,000 Jobs In August By Arthur Delaney

Economic indicators
Undergarments
Men